The NWA Southeastern Heavyweight Championship or Gulf Coast Heavyweight Championship was one of two identically named regional championship titles, a Southern and Northern division promoted by Southeast Championship Wrestling. The Southern division was established in 1978 as a continuation of the NWA Gulf Coast Heavyweight Championship and existed until its merge with the Northern division in 1980. The unified championship continued to be active until 1988 when it was abandoned.

Title history

See also
National Wrestling Alliance
Gulf Coast Championship Wrestling

References

External links
Wrestling-Titles.com

Continental Championship Wrestling championships
National Wrestling Alliance championships
United States regional professional wrestling championships
Heavyweight wrestling championships